Neocrepidodera adelinae is a species of flea beetle from a leaf beetle family that is endemic to Italy.

References

Beetles described in 1947
Beetles of Europe
adelinae
Endemic fauna of Italy